In United States landlord-tenant law, Edwards v. Habib, 397 F.2d 687 (D.C. Cir. 1968), was a case decided by the D.C. Circuit that includes the first recognition of retaliatory eviction as a defense to eviction.

Factual background
Plaintiff Edwards rented property from defendant Habib on a month-to-month basis.  Habib failed to address sanitary code violations brought up by Edwards, so Edwards reported Habib to the Department of Licenses and the Inspection Department.  An inspection revealed 40 sanitary code violations, and Habib was ordered to rectify the violations.  After the inspection, Habib obtained a default judgment against Edwards in a statutory eviction action.

Holding
The court held that a tenant cannot be evicted for reporting sanitary code violations, and this became known as the defense of retaliatory eviction.

References

External links

Landlord–tenant law
Real property law
1968 in United States case law
United States Court of Appeals for the District of Columbia Circuit cases
Real property law in the United States